Microphrys weddelli is a species of crab in the family Majidae.

References

Majoidea
Crustaceans described in 1851
Taxa named by Henri Milne-Edwards